Luís Correa was a Spanish footballer who played as a forward. He was part of the first-ever team fielded by Celta de Vigo in 1923. The dates of his birth and death are unknown.

Club career
Born in Vigo, he began his career at his hometown club Rápido de Bouzas. He then played for Racing de Ferrol in 1921/22 and 1922/23, before signing for Fortuna de Vigo, a club that in 1923 merged with Real Vigo Sporting in 1923, to form Celta de Vigo. Correa played in the last match that was held between these two rivals on 11 March 1923, which the fortunistas lost 0–1. The presentation match of Celta de Vigo was held at Coia on 16 September 1923, in a meeting between an A and a B team formed with the players from the club, taking advantage of the large team available that they had, and Correa was one of the 11 footballers that lined-up for the A team. On 10 April 1924, he played a friendly match for Celta against the Uruguay national team that would go on to win the 1924 Summer Olympics in Paris. He won three back-to-back Galician Championships with Celta in 1923-24, 1924-25 and 1925-26 before retiring at the end of that same season.

International career
Like many other Celta players of that time, he played for the Galicia national team, netting 2 goals in his debut, which was a friendly against a Pontevedra XI on 28 January 1923.

Honours

Club
Celta de Vigo
Galician Championship:
Winners (2) 1923-24, 1924-25 and 1925-26

References

Date of birth missing
Date of death missing
Footballers from Vigo
Spanish footballers
Association football forwards
Racing de Ferrol footballers
RC Celta de Vigo players